Phosphole is the organic compound with the chemical formula ; it is the phosphorus analog of pyrrole. The term phosphole also refers to substituted derivatives of the parent heterocycle. These compounds are of theoretical interest but also serve as ligands for transition metals and as precursors to more complex organophosphorus compounds.

Triphosphole, is a heterocycle with 3 phosphorus atoms.

Pentaphosphole, is a cyclic compound with 5 phosphorus atoms.

Structure and bonding
Unlike the related 5-membered heterocycles pyrrole, thiophene, and furan, the aromaticity of phospholes is diminished, reflecting the reluctance of phosphorus to delocalize its lone pair. The main indication of this difference is the pyramidalization of phosphorus. The absence of aromaticity is also indicated by the reactivity of phospholes. Phospholes undergo different cycloaddition reactions; coordination properties of phospholes are also well studied.

Preparation
The parent phosphole was first described in 1983. It was prepared by low-temperature protonation of lithium phospholide. Pentaphenylphosphole was reported in 1953. One route to phospholes is via the McCormack reaction, involving the addition of a 1,3-diene to a phosphonous chloride (RPCl2) followed by dehydrohalogenation. Phenylphospholes can be prepared via zirconacyclopentadienes by reaction with PhPCl2.

Reactivity
The behavior of the secondary phospholes, those with P−H bond, is dominated by the reactivity of this group.  The parent phosphole readily rearranges by migration of H from P to carbon-2, followed by dimerization.

Most phospholes are tertiary, typically P-methyl or P-phenyl. The nonaromaticity of these phospholes is manifested in their reactivity but the P−C bonds remain intact. For example, they undergo Diels–Alder reactions with electrophilic alkynes. They are basic at P, serving as ligands.

2,5-Diphenyl phospholes can be functionalised by deprotonation followed by P-acylation then a 1H, 2H, 3H phospholide equilibrium resulting in a 1:3 shift of the acyl group.

Phospholes can also be turned into β-functional phosphabenzenes (phosphinines, or phosphorine) via functionalisation by imidoyl chloride and insertion.

See also
 Benzophosphole
 Metallole
 Organophosphorus compound
 Phosphorine,

References

Phosphorus heterocycles
Five-membered rings
Substances discovered in the 1980s